Newton Williams (born May 10, 1959) is a former American football running back. He played for the San Francisco 49ers in 1982 and for the Baltimore Colts in 1983.

References

1959 births
Living people
American football running backs
Arizona State Sun Devils football players
San Francisco 49ers players
Baltimore Colts players